Lähte is a small borough in Tartu Parish, Tartu County in eastern Estonia. As of 2011 Census, the settlement's population was 492.

References

Boroughs and small boroughs in Estonia
Tartu Parish